Concerto pour une Voix (Concerto for one Voice) is a contemporary classical song written by the  French composer Saint-Preux in 1969, combining 
elements from popular music and electronic music.
The piece was first sung by Danielle Licari.

History 
Saint-Preux composed the Concerto, his biggest hit, in Poland, where he had been very well seen by the criticism after defending in August 1969, in the Sopot International Song Festival, La valse de l'enfance (The Waltz of Youth) with Saint-Preux conducting the symphony orchestra.

When Saint-Preux returned to France, René Boyer, head of the music publishers Fantasia, arranged Concerto pour une Voix and recorded it. Danielle Licari sang it using a vocalise technique similar to scat singing in jazz. The song, released on the Disc'AZ label in 1969, made both her career and his. In a few months it had sold over 3,000,000 copies in France alone, and gained recognition outside France as well. In the week of 22 August 1970 it entered the charts in Mexico at #10 and Japan at #20, He won Gold disc and a Japanese "Oscar" for the best original music.

Since that time Concerto pour une voix has been recorded by many other musicians, including Maxim Saury, Caravelli, Aimable Pluchard, and Raymond Lefèvre. An excerpt from the original Licari version appears in Wyclef Jean's 1997 album The Carnival, and the song was also performed in André Rieu's 2007/2008 In Wonderland tour. In the Rieu show, Concerto pour une Voix was performed by Mirusia Louwerse dressed as an angel singing from high above the orchestra.

In 2005, Saint-Preux adapted Concerto pour une Voix for two singers. This latter version, Concerto pour deux Voix (Concerto for Two Voices), was recorded in 2005 by the composer's daughter Clémence and Jean-Baptiste Maunier who starred in the film, Les Choristes.

Arrangements 
This songs has seen dozens of arrangements and recordings.
 Sung by Raymond Lefèvre, 1977
 Sung by Mirla Castellanos, 1974
 Sung by Dalida, 1970
 Sung by Meagan Duhamel, 2010
 Sung by Giorgia Fumanti, 2010
 Sung by Jean-Baptiste Maunier and Clemence, 2011
 Sung by Zhou Shen, 2022

References

External links 
Official website

1969 songs
French songs